Bernard Gregory Robinson, Jr. (born December 26, 1980) is an American former professional basketball player who played 3 seasons in the National Basketball Association (NBA) with the Charlotte Bobcats and New Jersey Nets.

Career
After a career at the University of Michigan, where he helped lead the Wolverines to the 2004 NIT title, Robinson was a second round draft pick of the Charlotte Bobcats in the 2004 NBA draft. As a rookie in 2004–05, Robinson appeared in 31 games, averaging 3.0 points and 1.5 rebounds per game.

On January 3, 2007, Robinson was traded by the Bobcats to the New Jersey Nets for Jeff McInnis.

In the 2007 offseason, he tore his medial collateral ligament in his left knee. On October 29, 2007, he was traded to New Orleans Hornets along with Mile Ilić for David Wesley. Both of them were immediately waived by the Hornets.

Novo Basquete Brasil (NBB)
In 2010, Robinson signed with Minas Tênis Clube in Brazil.

In 2012, he signed with Basquete Cearense in Brazil.

References

External links
NBB Player Profile
 
Profile @ Basketball-reference.com
Profile @ Latinbasket.com

1980 births
Living people
African-American basketball players
American expatriate basketball people in Argentina
American expatriate basketball people in Brazil
American expatriate basketball people in the Dominican Republic
American expatriate basketball people in the Philippines
American men's basketball players
Associação de Basquete Cearense players
Basketball players from Washington, D.C.
Charlotte Bobcats draft picks
Charlotte Bobcats players
Dunbar High School (Washington, D.C.) alumni
Michigan Wolverines men's basketball players
Minas Tênis Clube basketball players
New Jersey Nets players
Novo Basquete Brasil players
Quimsa basketball players
Shooting guards
Small forwards
21st-century African-American sportspeople
20th-century African-American people